Catherine Perez-Shakdam is a French journalist, political analyst and commentator. She specializes in West Asian and Islamic affairs. Shakdam is a former consultant for UNSC on Yemen and she is an expert on Islamic terrorism, radicalization and antisemitism.

Early life 
Shakdam was born into a secular Jewish family in France. اHer maternal grandfather fought Nazis during the Nazi occupation of the country. Her paternal grandfather was a Holocaust survivor. She has a bachelor's degree in Psychology and two Master's degrees in finance and communications from University of London.  During her studies at University of London she met a Muslim man from Yemen and later converted to Sunni Islam during their marriage. However she later became a Shia Muslim and wrote several books and many articles about Shia Islam. She divorced from her husband in 2014 and has custody of her two children. She now identifies as a Zionist and an atheist.

Journalistic career 
Prior to becoming a full time journalist, she worked for Wikistrat, an Israeli geostrategic and analysis firm, for seven years. She wrote extensively for the Russian International Affairs Council, Tehran Times, IRIB, The Majalla, Press TV, HuffPost, the Foreign Policy Association, Yemen Post, The Oslo Times, Your Middle East, The Guardian, RT, Mehr News and Tasnim News agencies, The Foreign Policy Journal, The Duran, MintPress News, the American Herald Tribune, openDemocracy, The Age of Reflection and many more.

Shakdam is also the managing director of Access Media and served as Special Adviser for the Middle East for the late Prince Ali Seraj of Afghanistan. She is the director and founder of Veritas-Consulting. She was affiliated with Shafaqna Institute for Middle East Studies in the UK (2015–2017).

Work in Iran 
Shakdam traveled frequently to Iran and became a regular author in many Iranian right wing news agencies such as Mashregh News, Tasnim News, Mehr News and even Iranian supreme leader's website "Khamenei.ir". In November 2021 Shakdam wrote in her blog in The Times of Israel that she is divorced and no longer a Muslim. She implied that her radical Muslim persona was in order to infiltrate Iran and other Muslim countries.

Shakdam traveled to Iran in 2017 and met with then candidate Ebrahim Raisi. She accompanied Raisi on his travels to Rasht and sat exclusively with him for an interview. Shakdam wrote in her blog that Iranian authorities trusted her because of her French nationality and marriage to a Muslim man. She wrote that she was invited by one of the important people of the revolution who studied in the United States.

In February 2022 a Telegram channel supporting the former Iranian President Mahmoud Ahmadinejad wrote an article based on the blog post in The Times of Israel that the highest level of Iranian government had been infiltrated by Israeli spies.  Many Iranian right-wing news agencies immediately took down all the articles written by Shakdam and denied collaboration.

Shakdam wrote in her blog that she detested Islam's disdain for women. She further added that prior to her visit to Iran she neither argued nor revealed her true intentions.

Radical articles and pieces written by Shakdam were criticized heavily by many Jewish organizations such as Anti-Defamation League (ADL) and MEMRI without ever mentioning her Jewish ancestry.

Books 
 Perez-Shakdam, C. (2015). Arabia's Rising: Under the Banner of the First Imam. (n.p.): CreateSpace Independent Publishing Platform, 
 Perez-Shakdam, C. (2016). From Mecca to the Plain of Karbala: Walking with the Holy Household of the Prophet. (n.p.): CreateSpace Independent Publishing Platform. .
 Perez-Shakdam, C. (2016). A Tale of Grand Resistance: Yemen, the Wahhabi and the House of Saud. (n.p.): CreateSpace Independent Publishing Platform. .

See also 
 Eli Cohen

References 

French people of Jewish descent
French Jews
Converts to Islam from Judaism
French women journalists
Living people
Jewish journalists
Jewish atheists
French Zionists
French former Shia Muslims
French atheist writers
Converts to Shia Islam from Sunni Islam
Year of birth missing (living people)